Gryphus is a genus of brachiopods belonging to the family Terebratulidae.

The species of this genus are found in Europe and Northern America.

Species

Species:

Gryphus capensis 
Gryphus clarkeana 
Gryphus cookei

References

Brachiopod genera
Terebratulida